Ann Ward (1715/16 – 10 April 1789) was a British printer and business owner.

Biography 
Little is known about Ann's early life, save that she married a York printer, Caesar Ward, in 1738. Caesar, and his brother-in-law Richard Chandler bought the York Courant newspaper. Chandler committed suicide in 1744 and Caesar Ward was declared bankrupt in 1744. When Caesar died in 1759, the paper passed to Ann Ward and she continued to run it until her death in 1789. in York, the Wards owned a book shop above the Black Swan pub in Coney Street and the printers was based off Coney Street in a former bagnio in Leopard's Yard. Ann Ward worked with the printer David Russell, who became a part-owner of the business but his name did not appear on publications. Ann bought back Russel's share in the company in 1787 so she could pass the whole business to her son-in-law George Peacock.

As a printer, Ann is best known for her role in the publication of the first edition of Laurence Sterne's The Life and Opinions of Tristram Shandy, Gentleman in 1760. Sterne had originally approached Robert Dodsley in London to print the book, but after a disagreement he took it to Ward in York. "The Book shall be printed here", Sterne wrote to Dodsley in October 1759.

Ward also printed other important publications. The first guide book to the city of York was printed by Ward in 1787. It was a 32-page volume detailing York's public buildings and a directory of principal merchants and tradespeople in the city. Ward also issued a two volume history of York Minster detailing the site and its clergy based on the 1737 Eboracum by Francis Drake. In 1779 Ward published a book of poems by William Mason. An 18th-century short-title catalogue records almost a hundred titles printed by Ann Ward.

References

1710s births
1789 deaths
People from York
Women printers
British printers
18th-century English businesswomen